"Attack of the Graske" is an interactive mini-episode of the British science fiction television series Doctor Who that was first broadcast on the BBC Red Button service on 25 December 2005. It was then made available as an online game on the official Doctor Who website.

Plot
The Tenth Doctor welcomes the viewer into the TARDIS. He tells them that he has been watching the viewer for some time, as they have been watching him, and that he has been impressed enough to want to take the viewer to help him on his next adventure. His current companion, Rose, has been dropped off at Wembley in 1979 for an ABBA concert. He then imbues the viewer's television remote control with the power of his sonic screwdriver, allowing the viewer to take part in the proceedings.

To start, the Doctor shows his new assistant a family of six celebrating Christmas in a living room, by means of the TARDIS scanner – a family, it seems, like any other, except that one of them is an alien imposter. By alternating between two different viewpoints, namely from within the family's television set and from the handheld digicam the daughter got for Christmas, the viewer has to determine who does not belong.

Shortly into the sequence, the mother's eyes glow for about half a second, revealing her as the imposter. She is now alone with the father in the house's kitchen. A small alien transmats onto the kitchen table, where he uses a handheld device to zap the father. The Doctor tells the viewer that the alien is a Graske, a species that invades planets by replacing its population. When he is done, the Graske transmats away, leaving a changeling of the father behind to join that of the mother.

As the Doctor tracks the Graske through time, the viewer takes command of the TARDIS's controls, and activates the vortex loop, dimensional stabiliser, and vector tracker as requested. Eventually, the Graske is located about 120 years in the past, somewhere in Victorian Britain. The viewer must use a map on the TARDIS scanner to pinpoint its location, as the screen blips where the Graske's DNA is found. After zooming in to High Holborn in Holborn, central London, on Christmas 1883, the viewer takes a quick walk around a square and must then uncover the Graske from its hiding place.

Having been found behind some boxes, the Graske kidnaps a young street urchin by zapping him, and, as before, leaves a changeling in his place. Tracking the Graske, the Doctor takes the viewer to the Graske's base on Griffoth and guides them through the base. Having used three number and logic puzzles to pass through the airlocks, the viewer arrives in a room filled with various beings in stasis pods; the Graske keep the originals to sustain the copies. The viewer also learns of the Graske's ultimate intention to replace every living, sentient creature in the universe with one of their doubles.

However, the viewer is spotted and must duck to avoid a Graske's weapon fire. The blast ricochets around the room and frees a Slitheen from a stasis pod, who then proceeds to vengefully chase the Graske who imprisoned it. The viewer thus has the opportunity to make one last crucial decision — either the teleport settings can be reversed, sending all the kidnapped beings back to their proper places in space and time, or the Graske's own stasis control can be used against them, freezing the Graske and everything else in their base.

Depending on the choice the viewer makes, there are two alternative endings to the episode:
If the viewer decides to freeze the entire Graske base, the Graske and all of their victims become trapped. The changeling mother and father talk mechanically with the rest of their family, and the daughter storms off to her room, believing that her parents are trying to ruin Christmas.
If the decision is made to send the victims back, the viewer sees all the stasis pods being emptied, and the mother and father of the family are quickly glimpsed livening up the party at their house whilst "Another Rock And Roll Christmas" by Gary Glitter plays in the background. The universe — and the family's Christmas — are saved.

As the Doctor takes the viewer home, the programme evaluates the viewer's "score". Depending on how well they did, either the Doctor decides that his new companion is not quite ready for the job (but was not far off and should try again), or the Doctor comments on how impressed he is with the viewer, saying that perhaps one day he will call on their help to save the universe again.

In either case, the Doctor then removes the sonic powers from the viewer's remote control and bids them farewell, firing up the TARDIS to go back for Rose, but warns the viewer that "if you turn the TV over to ITV, the galaxy may implode", referencing the rivalry between ITV and BBC.

Production

This episode had the working title Changeling World. Executive producer Julie Gardner told Doctor Who Magazine that the mini-episode was treated as a "full-blooded, sophisticated production," with a new alien villain, new sets and new special effects. Writer Gareth Roberts went on to write the episodes "Invasion of the Bane" (co-written with Russell T Davies), Revenge of the Slitheen, The Empty Planet, Goodbye, Sarah Jane Smith (co-written with Clayton Hickman), The Temptation of Sarah Jane Smith, The Wedding of Sarah Jane Smith and Whatever Happened to Sarah Jane? for the Doctor Who spin-off The Sarah Jane Adventures, as well as the Doctor Who episodes "The Shakespeare Code", "The Unicorn and the Wasp", "Planet of the Dead" (co-written with Davies), "The Lodger", "Closing Time", and "The Caretaker" (co-written with Steven Moffat).

The countdown to the start of the segment uses a design based on the Gallifreyan script seen in the series, and includes both Arabic numerals and the Gallifreyan numerals used in the New Series Adventures. The countdown shown for the tasks is a simplified version of this which does not include the Gallifreyan numerals.

Unlike all other new series episodes, this episode is presented in 4:3 aspect ratio.

This episode was the only interactive episode to be telecasted on BBC or any affiliate of the British Broadcasting Corporation (BBC), but it is still available at the BBC or the official Doctor Who website.

Location shooting took place at the Coal Exchange and Mount Stuart Square, Cardiff Bay.

Music
The music played during the countdown is the orchestral arrangement of the Doctor Who theme music which plays over the credits of "The Christmas Invasion". The musical cue used during the later challenge sequences is from "The End of the World".

Broadcast
A total of 496,000 viewers played Attack of the Graske on the BBC Red Button service. The episode was available again following the New Year's Day repeat transmission of "The Christmas Invasion". As of 30 March 2006 the game had an average of 41,000 hits every week on the BBC's Doctor Who website.

References

External links

 

Tenth Doctor episodes
Films with screenplays by Gareth Roberts (writer)
Slitheen stories
Doctor Who mini-episodes